Ase Boas (born 1988) is a Papua New Guinean rugby league footballer who plays for Rabaul Gurias. A Papua New Guinean representative , Boas previously played for the Featherstone Rovers in the Championship. He was a member of PNG's squads at the 2013 and 2017 World Cup tournaments.

Playing career
Boas was the captain for the PNG Hunters in the 2017 Queensland Cup season where they won the title. He previously played for the Rabaul Gurias in the PNG domestic competition, which he captained to premiership victory in 2012 before joining the Hunters in 2015. He is the elder brother of fellow PNG representative Watson Boas.

Boas comes from a mixed parentage of East New Britain, Oro and Simbu in Papua New Guinea.

Boas represented Papua New Guinea in rugby league nines at the 2015 Pacific Games.

Boas signed with the Featherstone Rovers for the 2019 season, alongside his brother Watson. He was released for personal reasons after making five appearances for the club.

References

External links
RLWC 2017 profile

1988 births
Living people
Featherstone Rovers players
Papua New Guinea Hunters players
Papua New Guinea national rugby league team players
Papua New Guinean rugby league players
Rabaul Gurias players
Rugby league halfbacks
Rugby league five-eighths